The Manila Economic and Cultural Office is the representative office of the Philippines in Taiwan, functioning as a de facto embassy in the absence of diplomatic relations. It is a non-stock non-profit corporation organized under Philippine law.

It was first established in 1975 as the Asian Exchange Center, replacing the former Philippine Embassy. In 1984, its staff acquired diplomatic privileges and immunity, as did those of its Taiwanese  counterpart in Manila, then known as the Pacific Economic and Cultural Center. It adopted its present name in December 1989.   

In addition to its Taipei Office, it also maintains Extension Offices in Kaohsiung and Taichung. 

Its counterpart body in the Philippines is the Taipei Economic and Cultural Office in the Philippines in Manila.

See also
 Philippines–Taiwan relations
 List of diplomatic missions in Taiwan
 List of diplomatic missions of the Philippines

Footnotes

Notes

References

1975 establishments in Taiwan
Philippines
Taipei
Philippines–Taiwan relations
Organizations established in 1975